Muraiyur is a village in the Taluk of Singampunari in the district of Sivaganga in the Indian state of Tamil Nadu.

Distance from other locations:
 from the Taluk's main town of Singampunari
 from the district's main city of Sivaganga
 from the state capital of Chennai.

Villages in Sivaganga district